Armoured companion (Polish: Towarzysz pancerny , plural: towarzysze pancerni) was a medium-cavalryman in 16th to 18th century Poland, named after their chainmail armor. These units were the second-most-important (and successful) cavalry in the Polish-Lithuanian army, after the hussars.

Most pancerni were recruited from the middle or lower classes of the Polish (or Lithuanian) nobility. They were organized into companies, with each company (Polish: chorągiew or rota) consisting of 60 to 200 horsemen.

Arms 
They used chainmail or bechter armour to protect the upper body, vambrace sometimes with gauntlets, secretes (rarely lobster-tailed pot helmets), buckler shields, Polish sabre, reflex bow, gunpowder weapons, (such as flintlock pistols, arquebus or muskets, and early carabines). Earlier companies would sometimes be equipped with a horseman's pick, a short spear, or a lance. During the rule of king John III Sobieski, polearms became compulsory.

During the Middle Ages, under the rule of Mieszko I and Bolesław I the Brave, the name pancerni applied to the members of the duke's retinue. They were the wealthiest warriors in the Polish army, and as such, they could afford to wear sophisticated armour, most commonly chainmail. Their weapons included arming swords, axes, spears, shields, strait bows, and nasal helmets.

See also

 Polish cavalry
 Towarzysz
 Poczet
 Pocztowy
 Offices in the Polish-Lithuanian Commonwealth
 Petyhorcy

Polish titles
Military ranks of Poland
Polish cavalry